Qordoba was an artificial intelligence company based in San Francisco, California that provided Software as a Service (SaaS) technology. The organization invented a content intelligence platform for content quality.

History 
Qordoba was incorporated in the U.S. in 2015 by co-founders May Habib and Waseem AlShikh. Qordoba became Writer, Inc. in August 2020. 

Qordoba was a privately held company, supported by investment from Aspect Ventures, Rincon Venture Partners, Upfront Ventures, and Broadway Angels.

See also 
 Artificial intelligence
 Machine learning
 Natural language processing
 Natural language generation

References

External links 

2015 establishments in California
Technology companies established in 2015
Technology companies based in the San Francisco Bay Area
Applications of artificial intelligence
Natural language processing software
American companies established in 2015
Grammar checkers